Barsha Rani Bishaya is an Indian actress who works in Assamese cinema. Bishaya is also part of mobile theatre groups of Assam. Apart from acting, she is also a Bihu dancer in Assam. She has also acted in many popular VCD films, hosted TV shows and also acted in television series and telefilms.

Career
In 1998, Bishaya made her debut in the Assamese film Joubone Aamoni Kore directed by Ashok Kumar Bishaya.Along with the films she has also appeared in various mobile theatres of Assam. In 2009, the critically acclaimed Assamese film Basundhara where she has done a very challenging role won the 57th National Film Awards for Best Feature Film in Assamese.

Filmography

Film

Short film/web series

Awards and nominations

References

External links 
 ‘Ratnakar’ actress Barasha Rani Bishaya officially gets hitched

Living people
Indian film actresses
Indian television actresses
Actresses in Assamese cinema
Actresses in Assamese television
Actresses from Guwahati
21st-century Indian actresses
Year of birth missing (living people)